is a Japanese professional footballer who plays as a forward for Ventforet Kofu.

Career
After winning the national championship with Yamanashi Gakuin High School, Miyazaki joined Ventforet Kofu in 2019.

https://www.hochi.co.jp/soccer/national/20190106-OHT1T50216.html</ref>

Career statistics
Updated to 1 January 2022.

References

External links
Profile at Ventforet Kofu

2000 births
Living people
Japanese footballers
Association football people from Tokyo
Association football forwards
Ventforet Kofu players
J2 League players